Cuneisigna cumamita is a moth of the family Noctuidae first described by George Thomas Bethune-Baker in 1911. It is found in Kenya and South Africa.

References

Catocalinae
Moths of Africa
Moths described in 1911